The Immaculate Collection is the first greatest hits album by American singer Madonna, released on November 13, 1990, by Sire Records. It contains fifteen of her hit singles recorded throughout the 1980s, as well as two brand new tracks, "Justify My Love" and "Rescue Me". All the previously released material were reworked through the QSound audio technology, becoming the first ever album to use it. Meanwhile, the new material saw Madonna working with Lenny Kravitz and Shep Pettibone. The album's title is a pun on the Immaculate Conception, a Marian dogma of the Catholic Church.

The release of the album was accompanied by a same-titled home video release, an EP titled The Holiday Collection, and a box set titled The Royal Box. "Justify My Love" was released as the lead single from the album, with a controversial music video featuring overtly sexual imagery. After being banned by MTV, the video was released on VHS and became the best-selling video single of all time. It also became Madonna's ninth number-one single on the US Billboard Hot 100 chart. The second single, "Rescue Me", had the highest debut on the chart since the Beatles' "Let It Be" (1970) and peaked at number nine.

The Immaculate Collection received universal acclaim from critics, who deemed it a defining retrospective of 1980s music. The album reached number two on the US Billboard 200 chart, while topping the charts in Argentina, Australia, Canada, Finland, Ireland, and the United Kingdom. It became Madonna's second album to be certified diamond by the Recording Industry Association of America (RIAA) for shipments of over ten million units. The Immaculate Collection has sold over 30 million copies worldwide, making it the best-selling compilation by a solo artist ever and one of the best-selling albums of all time. It has been featured on all-time critic lists by several publications, including Blender which named it the greatest American album of all time.

Background and development 

By the end of the 1980s, Madonna had become the biggest female singles artist in history, with the most number-one and top-ten hit songs by a woman in both the United States and the United Kingdom. J. Randy Taraborrelli, author of Madonna: An Intimate Biography, noted that a Madonna's greatest hits album was ready by that point, serving as "a proud landmark" of her career which had progressed upwards since she entered the music scene in 1982. Following the completion of the 1990 Blond Ambition World Tour, Madonna began rushing the project aimed to be released in time for the year's Christmas season. On October 13, 1990, Billboard magazine confirmed that Madonna had been working on new material for the album with Shep Pettibone and Lenny Kravitz.

The Immaculate Collection contains fifteen previously released Madonna singles in chronological order, from "Holiday" (1983) to "Vogue" (1990). All of them were reworked using QSound by Pettibone, alongside Goh Hotoda and Michael Hutchinson within a month and a half. It became the first album to use QSound, which then was a new technology that gives recordings three-dimensional sound on standard stereo systems. Tracks have been edited down from their original lengths to decrease the overall running time. Minor alterations and additions have been applied to every track; for example, "Material Girl" has a new outro in place of the original fade-out. Pettibone also remixed "Into the Groove", "Like a Prayer", and "Express Yourself", featuring different music productions from their original album versions. Pettibone later commented:
Well, actually some of the songs we changed up a bit, but most of the songs we kept in their original form. Like "Holiday", "Lucky Star", et cetera, et cetera, those were all the original productions. The remix was just really to create the QSound, and make the song kind of envelop you when you listened to it in a certain sweet spot in front of the speakers [...] That wasn't easy to do. But then again, that was one of those—you know, "Hurry up, this has to be out last week". That was a rush rush job.

Two new songs, "Justify My Love" and "Rescue Me", were included on the album in order to generate public interest. "Justify My Love" is a trip hop song, featuring Madonna's spoken word vocals over a "grinding, sparse" hip hop groove. It was first written as a love letter by Ingrid Chavez, who was having an affair with Kravitz at the time. He invited her over a studio to record the letter and later took a master copy of the song to Virgin Records after the end of their relationship. Months later, Kravitz told Chavez that the song would be released by Madonna and he asked her to sign a document saying that Chavez would receive 12.5% publishing royalties, but no writing credit. She signed the paper, and was then invited to meet Madonna in the studio while they mixed the track. However, Chavez later sued Kravitz in 1992 and reached an out-of-court settlement whereby she received a co-writing credit. The second new song, "Rescue Me", is a dance-pop and gospel-house track written and produced by Madonna and Pettibone. Lyrically, "Rescue Me" expresses the extinguishing of deranged behavior in a relationship and features spoken word verses, like on "Justify My Love".

Packaging, release, and promotion 

The album was packaged in a gatefold sleeve which did not feature Madonna's image on the cover. Instead, a short haired, brunette Madonna was featured on the two inner sleeves along with lyrics for the two previously unreleased tracks. Photographer Herb Ritts shot the booklet's black-and-white images, which previously appeared on the June 1990 issue of Interview magazine. Madonna continued referencing Catholicism on The Immaculate Collection, dedicating the album to "The Pope, my divine inspiration" on its booklet. This led to many believing it was dedicated to Pope John Paul II, but it was actually dedicated to her brother, Christopher Ciccone, who had spent the year on tour with Madonna on the Blond Ambition World Tour and whose nickname is "The Pope". The album's title is a pun on the Immaculate Conception, a conception of the Virgin Mary without the stain of original sin. In The Everything Mary Book (2006), editors explained "the album's colors of blue and gold resonate with some of the colors used in the traditional images of Virgin Mary". The album was originally titled Ultra Madonna, but the plan was changed as it was too similar to the name of Ultra Naté, a then-new artist in Warner Bros. However, it was marketed in Japan with the title Ultra Madonna: Greatest Hits.

The Immaculate Collection was released in the United States on November 13, 1990, by Sire Records. A same-titled home video was also released, containing 13 music videos, including the live performance of "Vogue" at the 1990 MTV Video Music Awards. A box set titled The Royal Box was issued on December 4, 1990, containing the album, VHS, a poster, and postcards. An extended play (EP) titled The Holiday Collection was also released in Europe with the same design as The Immaculate Collection. The full-length album version of "Holiday" was included on the EP, alongside three worldwide chart hits omitted from the album: "True Blue", "Who's That Girl", and "Causing a Commotion". The re-release of "Holiday" eventually went to number five in the UK Singles Chart. "Crazy for You", the 1985 single from Vision Quest, was another UK re-release at the time, reaching number two on the chart.

"Justify My Love" was released as the album's lead single on November 6, 1990. It became her ninth number one on the Billboard Hot 100 and the top ten in many other countries. The black-and-white music video caused controversy for its sexually explicit imagery and was banned by MTV. Due to this prohibition, the music video was commercially released as a video single, and become the highest-selling in this format of all time. Liz Smith from Sarasota Herald-Tribune commented that the headlines and gossip would only hype more interest in the album. 

Initially there were no plans to release any follow-up single to "Justify My Love", so no music video was filmed for "Rescue Me". However, the latter started receiving airplay in the radios as an album cut, prompting Sire Records to finally release it as an official single. "Rescue Me" entered the Billboard Hot 100 chart at number fifteen—thus becoming the highest-debuting single since the Beatles' "Let It Be" (1970)—and eventually peaked at number nine. The single also reached number three on the European Hot 100 Singles chart.

Critical reception 

The Immaculate Collection received universal acclaim from music critics. AllMusic senior editor Stephen Thomas Erlewine wrote that the album "remains a necessary purchase, because it captures everything Madonna is about and it proves that she was one of the finest singles artists of the '80s." However, he felt that "while all the hits are present, they're simply not in their correct versions" due to the QSound remastering and significant changes in several songs. Billboard commented that the album was "irresistible holiday buying fare", and praised the QSound process for adding "unheard detail and depth to the recordings". David Browne from Entertainment Weekly opined that the album was "as relentless as the woman herself", and "refocuses our attention on how brilliant her records have been over the years—and gives us a peek into the obstacles she might face as her career enters the '90s." Jim Farber of the same magazine stated: "More than a mere greatest-hits set, it's hands down the catchiest collection of '80s singles." Peter Buckley, author of the book The Rough Guide to Rock, wrote that the album "stakes Madonna's claim to be the best singles act of the 80s."

Rolling Stone called the album the "standard bearer for Madonna compilations", summing up the first stage of Madonna's career "flawlessly" with an addition of "worthy sensual" new tracks. In a review for Music & Media, Pieter de Bruyn Kops complimented the album's new material as "brilliant" and said that "Madonna proves again she is the ruling Queen of Pop." Danny Eccleston from Q magazine said the album's "ambitious title" was justified by "magnificent content: 17-track best of enhanced by the hard-faced sexiness of Lenny Kravitz-aided Justify My Love (and Rescue Me)." Robert Christgau called it "the greatest album of [Madonna's] mortal life" featuring "seventeen hits, more than half of them indelible classics." Writing for Stereogum, Tom Breihan commented the compilation "is even more impressive when you think about what didn't make it onto the album." Ross Bennett from Mojo called the album "truly the best of best of's" and stated: "This has to be right up there with ABBA Gold as a collection of singles so deeply ingrained in the collective consciousness [...] But there is no denying the pop nous behind Ms Ciccone's first 15 years of hits, here brilliantly packaged in, gasp, chronological order."

J.D. Considine from The Baltimore Sun considered it "no mere greatest hits" and commented, "Immaculate? Impeccable is more like it." Lucy O'Brien in her book Madonna: Like an Icon deemed the album a "seamless marriage of high-octane pop and dance", as well as "the ultimate party record". Selects Andrew Harrison wrote: "Given that she's had the good grace to leave out second-raters [...] it's hard to fault this wonderful collection. You might find better music this Christmas but you'll never hear better pop." Kevork Djansezian of Tulsa World commented that "if the controversy, the outrage, the boycotts, and the sexual revolution it created don't spark your interest, at least you can have a great time dancing and lip-synching to its acclaimed and definitely catchy pop tracks." Douglas Wolk from Pitchfork stated that the album is "the kind of perfect straight-into-orbit retrospective pop artists dream of achieving."

Commercial performance 

The Immaculate Collection has sold over 30 million copies worldwide, making it the best-selling compilation album ever by a solo artist and one of the world's best-selling albums of all time. In Madonna's home country, the album entered the Billboard 200 chart at number 32 on the week of December 1, 1990. It jumped to number two on January 26, 1991, being blocked from the top spot for two weeks by Vanilla Ice's To the Extreme. Nevertheless, it became the highest-charting greatest hits album in a decade since Kenny Rogers's Greatest Hits (1980). After Billboard overturned the rule preventing older albums to chart on the Billboard 200 in November 2009, The Immaculate Collection has made multiple re-entries on the chart, with the latest being its 148th week on September 10, 2016. The album also spent 290 weeks on the Catalog Albums chart, with a peak of number six. The Immaculate Collection was Madonna's second album, after Like a Virgin (1984), to be certified diamond (ten-time platinum) by Recording Industry Association of America (RIAA) for shipments of 10 million units. After the advent of the Nielsen SoundScan, the album has sold over 5,992,000 copies as of 2016.

In Canada, The Immaculate Collection topped the RPM albums chart for six consecutive weeks. It earned seven-time platinum certification from the Music Canada (MC) for shipments of 700,000 copies. It became one of the all-time best-selling albums in Latin American countries such as Mexico and Brazil, with sales of over 800,000 and 500,000 copies, respectively. In Australia, the album debuted at number one on the albums chart, remaining at the top for five weeks and the top 50 for 95 weeks. It received twelve-time platinum certification from the Australian Recording Industry Association (ARIA) and has sold over 880,000 copies as of January 2013, making it the best-selling female compilation album ever in Australia. In Japan, The Immaculate Collection charted for 26 weeks on the Oricon Albums Chart, with a peak of number five. The Recording Industry Association of Japan (RIAJ) certified it quadruple platinum for shipment of 800,000 copies.

The Immaculate Collection debuted atop the UK Albums Chart on November 24, 1990. Madonna became the first female artist to achieve four number-one albums and the first female to have a Christmas number-one album in the United Kingdom. Occupying the top position for nine weeks, the album broke the record for the longest consecutive weeks at number one by a female artist, a feat that would not be matched for 20 years until the release of Adele's album 21 (2011). It became the seventh best-selling album of the decade with 2.5 million copies. The Immaculate Collection was certified thirteen-time platinum by the British Phonographic Industry (BPI). It remains the best-selling solo compilation album in British music history, with sales of 3.77 million as of July 2016. In France, the album reached number four on the chart and was certified diamond by the Syndicat National de l'Édition Phonographique (SNEP). The sales of the album stand at 1.1 million copies there. The Immaculate Collection peaked at number 10 in Germany and was certified triple gold by the Bundesverband Musikindustrie (BVMI), denoting 750,000 units shipped. Across Europe, the album reached number one in Finland and Ireland, while peaking at number three on the pancontinental European Top 100 Albums chart.

Legacy 

Nick C Levine from Dazed magazine stated that The Immaculate Collection cemented Madonna's iconic status and "distilled her early career into one era-defining pop single after another." According to Stephen Thomas Erlewine of AllMusic, the album "captured the time when Madonna was the defining figure of American pop culture." Mike Wass from Idolator described the album as "a time capsule of the 1980s... [showing] the Queen of Pop's progression from bubblegum-pop diva to the risk-taking, rule-breaking icon she went on to become in the 1990s." James Rose from Daily Review retrospectively described The Immaculate Collection as "a story of women and pop music in the decade leading to 1990... pop music history, in itself a living timeline of an era." Writing for The Guardian, Lucy O'Brien recommended The Immaculate Collection for listeners who want to discover Madonna's back catalog since her 1980s hits "are brilliantly captured" on the album.

The album has been featured on a number of all-time lists by music critics. The New York Times dubbed The Immaculate Collection as one of the definitive album releases of the century. Rockdelux also named it one of the greatest albums of the 20th century. In 2003, the album was ranked number 278 on Rolling Stone magazine's list of "The 500 Greatest Albums of All Time". The latest update of the Rolling Stone list was published in September 2020, showing the album rising to number 138. Blender magazine placed the album at number one on their "100 Greatest American Albums of All Time" list, explaining:
Just as Bob Dylan's insurgent braininess embodied the boundary-stretching '60s, Madonna epitomized the '80s, from the coy consumerism of "Material Girl" to the stylish hedonism of "Vogue". She was a change-agent of Hollywood-blockbuster proportions, embodying womanhood's power while simultaneously upending musty notions of femininity... And, since this is above all expertly built, wonderfully sung music, the songcraft lets listeners ignore all of the above and just dance. [E]ach listen shows that Madonna's unerring musical instincts—let's go ahead and call it genius—were as formidable as her more famous ambition.

Other retrospective assessments specifically praised the album as a greatest hits collection. Drew Mackie of People, called the album "the best-named greatest hits compilation ever" and "easily one of the best greatest hits albums ever." In 2022, it was included in the Rolling Stone Italia list of the 10 greatest hits albums that "made history". NME ranked it as the second-best greatest hits album of all time, claiming that "In her pomp, Madonna was the best pop star of her time." Selena Dieringer from Houston Press listed The Immaculate Collection among the "ten really fantastic Greatest Hits albums". The Daily Telegraph ranked it as Madonna's best album, calling it "a phenomenal collection". It was also included in Outs The 100 Greatest, Gayest Albums of All Time, addressing the influence of records for the gay community, with staff calling it "the definitive document of her stratospherically successful first decade". Queerty editors selected The Immaculate Collection among 20 most important albums to shape LGBTQ culture, calling it "a must for any gold star gay's record collection."

Track listing 

Notes
 signifies additional lyrics by

Personnel 
Personnel credits adapted from the liner notes of The Immaculate Collection.

 Madonna – vocals, background vocals
 Lenny Kravitz – background vocals
 Dian Sorel – background vocals
 Catherine Russell – background vocals
 Lillias White – background vocals
 Henry Hirsch – recording
 David Domanich – recording
 Andy Cardenas – recording
 Josh Cuervokas – recording
 P. Dennis Mitchell – recording engineer
 Curt Frasca – assistant engineer
 Lolly Grodner – assistant engineer
 John Partham – assistant engineer
 Peter Schwartz – keyboards, programming
 Joe Moskowitz – additional programming
 Rob Mounsey – arranger
 Shep Pettibone – mixing, album coordinator
 Goh Hotoda – mixing
 Michael Hutchinson – mixing
 Ted Jensen – mastering
 Jane Brinton – album coordinator
 Freddy DeMann – management
 Herb Ritts – photography
 Jeri Heiden – art direction, design
 John Heiden – design
 Andre Guedes – digital booklet
 Gene Sculatti – liner notes

Charts

Weekly charts

Monthly charts

Year-end charts

Decade-end charts

Certifications and sales

See also 

 List of best-selling albums in Argentina
 List of best-selling albums in Australia
 List of best-selling albums in Brazil
 List of best-selling albums in France
 List of best-selling albums in Mexico
 List of best-selling albums in the United Kingdom
 List of best-selling albums in the United States
 List of Canadian number-one albums of 1991
 List of UK Albums Chart number ones of the 1990s
 List of number-one albums in Australia during the 1990s

Notes

References

Citations

Bibliography

External links 

1990 greatest hits albums
Albums produced by Lenny Kravitz
Albums produced by Madonna
Albums produced by Shep Pettibone
Madonna compilation albums
Sire Records compilation albums
Warner Records compilation albums